The  Abrial A-13 Buse was a tailless glider prototype that was designed in 1954. It was the last in a series of glider aircraft designed by Georges Abrial.

Design

The glider featured a short fuselage with a single, non-tapered strut-braced straight wing. The design had been demonstrated by very complete tests carried out on a 1:10 scale model at the Eiffel Laboratory but no full-size version was ever constructed.

Specifications Abrial A-13 Buse

See also

References

Glider aircraft
Buse
Tailless aircraft
High-wing aircraft